Bonnie Clabber Bluff is a cliff located in Burke County, Georgia. A variant spelling is "Bonny Clabber Bluff".

Bonnie Clabber Bluff most likely was named after the foodstuff bonny clabber.

References

Landforms of Laurens County, Georgia
Cliffs of the United States